Nikephoros Kallistos Xanthopoulos, Latinized as Nicephorus Callistus Xanthopulus, of Constantinople (c. 1256 – c. 1335), was the last of the Greek ecclesiastical historians.

His Historia Ecclesiastica, in eighteen books, starts the historical narrative down to 610. For the first four centuries, the author is largely dependent on his predecessors, Eusebius, Socrates Scholasticus, Sozomen, Theodoret and Evagrius, his additions showing very little critical faculty. His later work, which is based upon documents now no longer extant, is much more valuable.

A table of contents of another five books, continuing the history to the death of Leo VI the Wise in 911, also exists, but whether the books were ever actually written is doubtful. Some modern scholars are of opinion that Nicephorus appropriated and passed off as his own the work of an unknown author of the 10th century. The plan of the work is good and, in spite of its fables and superstitious absurdities, contains important facts which would otherwise have been unknown.

Only one manuscript of the history is known. It was stolen by a Turkish soldier from the library at Buda during the reign of Matthias Corvinus of Hungary and taken to Constantinople, where it was bought by a Christian and eventually reached the imperial library at Vienna.

Nicephorus was also the author of lists of the emperors and patriarchs of Constantinople, of a poem on the capture of Jerusalem, and of a synopsis of the Scriptures, all in iambics; and of commentaries on liturgical poems.  He also wrote many of the synaxaria in use in the Eastern Orthodox Church.

Notes

References
Migne, Patrologia Graeca vols. 145-147 - Greek text and Latin translation.

14th-century Byzantine historians
13th-century Byzantine historians
14th-century Eastern Orthodox Christians
History of Christianity texts
Writers from Constantinople